The 2013–14 Barys Astana season was the Kontinental Hockey League franchise's 6th season of play and 15th season overall. Barys posted a regular season record of 26 wins, 18 losses, 6 overtime/shootout wins and 4 overtime/shootout losses for 94 points. As a result, Barys won Chernyshev Division and finished 2nd in the Eastern Conference. The team qualified to playoffs a ten games before the end of the regular season on January 16, 2014. Barys ended the 2013–14 regular season as the Eastern Conference's second seed. In the first round of the 2014 Gagarin Cup playoffs, Barys defeated Avtomobilist Yekaterinburg 4-0 in series. Barys lost to Salavat Yulaev Ufa in semifinals 2-4 in series.

Off-season

On May 14, 2013, Nurlan Orazbayev appointed as a president of the Barys, after a one-year pause. He was in this role from 2006 to 2012, before appointing Vadim Shakshakbayev in 2012–13 season. On May 18, 2013, Barys announced team will play at the 2013 Spengler Cup. Later, it was cancelled, because applications for participation in the tournament have filed by two KHL teams - Barys and CSKA. Due to the Olympic season, the league was not able to provide a "window" on the calendar for two league clubs, and in the end the choice was made in favor of the "Red Army", which submitted firstly the application. On May 25, 2013, Barys unveiled a new uniform for the 2013–14 KHL season. The new uniform designed by Reebok and includes new orange lines on the sleeves (Orange is one of the colors of Kazakhstan Temir Zholy, the owner of Barys). At the 2013 KHL Junior Draft, Barys selected Finnish Kalevan Pallo's player Kasperi Kapanen in the first round, twenty fifth overall. Also, Barys selected Kaapo Kähkönen, Dmitri Grents and Alikhan Asetov in the 2nd, 3rd and 4th round, respectively. Barys has appointed Ari-Pekka Selin as head coach. The 50-year-old Finn has signed a two-year contract and fills the vacancy left by Vladimir Krikunov, who returns to Neftekhimik Nizhnekamsk. Selin’s previous job was in charge of HPK Hameenlinna in Finland’s SM-liiga, a role he combined with that of assistant to Finland men's national ice hockey team head coach Jukka Jalonen. Assisting the new Barys chief on the coaching staff will be Andrei Shayanov, Raimo Helminen, Yerlan Sagymbayev and Alexander Achziger. On July 4, 2013, Barys officially joined to Astana Presidential Sports Club. National Welfare Fund Samruk-Kazyna will be a co-sponsor for Barys, along with Tsesnabank.

Standings

Divisional standings

Conference standings

Schedule and results

Pre-season

|-  style="text-align:center; background:#cfc;"
| 1 || August 3 || @ HC Davos || 5-2 || Dmitri Malgin || Vaillant Arena, Davos || 556 || 1–0–0–0 || — || 
|-  style="text-align:center; background:#fcc;"
| 2 || August 4 || @ HC Davos || 1-3 || Dmitri Malgin || EH Gurlaina, Scuol || 503 || 1–1–0–0 || — || 
|-  style="text-align:center;
| colspan="10" | President of the Republic of Kazakhstan's Cup - Barys won the tournament
|-  style="text-align:center; background:#cfc;"
| 3 || August 9 || Amur Khabarovsk || 8-0 || Ari Ahonen || Kazakhstan Sports Palace || || 2–1–0–0 || 3 || 
|-  style="text-align:center; background:#d0e7ff;"
| 4 || August 10 || Yugra Khanty-Mansiysk || 5-4 (SO) || Vitali Yeremeyev || Kazakhstan Sports Palace ||  ||  2–1–1–0  || 5 || 
|-  style="text-align:center; background:#cfc;"
| 5 || August 12 || Vityaz Podolsk || 4-2 || Vitali Yeremeyev || Kazakhstan Sports Palace || 3,278 || 3–1–1–0 || 8 || 
|-  style="text-align:center; background:#cfc;"
| 6 || August 13 || Yugra Khanty-Mansiysk || 4-3 || Ari Ahonen || Kazakhstan Sports Palace ||  ||  4–1–1–0  || Final || 
|-  style="text-align:center;
| colspan="10" | Ivan Romazan Memorial Cup - Barys finished 3rd in the tournament
|-  style="text-align:center; background:#fcc;"
| 7 || August 26 || @ Metallurg Magnitogorsk || 0-4 || Ari Ahonen || Arena Metallurg ||  ||  4–2–1–0  || 0 || 
|-  style="text-align:center; background:#cfc;"
| 8 || August 27 || @ Traktor Chelyabinsk || 3-2 || Vitali Yeremeyev || Arena Metallurg ||  ||  5–2–1–0  || 3 || 
|-  style="text-align:center; background:#ffeeaa;"
| 9 || August 28 || @ Yugra Khanty-Mansiysk || 3-4 (SO) || Ari Ahonen || Arena Metallurg ||  ||  5–2–1–1  || 3 || 
|-

|-
| colspan=11 align="center"|

Regular season

|-  style="text-align:center; background:#cfc;"
| 1 || September 8 || Severstal Cherepovets || 10-1 || Ari Ahonen || Kazakhstan Sports Palace || 4,100 || 1–0–0–0 || 3 || 
|-  style="text-align:center; background:#cfc;"
| 2 || September 10 || Lokomotiv Yaroslavl || 5-3 || Ari Ahonen || Kazakhstan Sports Palace || 3,853 || 2-0-0-0 || 6 || 
|-  style="text-align:center; background:#fcc;" 
| 3 || September 12 || SKA Saint Petersburg || 2-5 || Ari Ahonen || Kazakhstan Sports Palace || 4,070 || 2-1-0-0 || 6 || 
|-  style="text-align:center; background:#cfc;"
| 4 || September 14 || Atlant Moscow Oblast || 5-4 || Vitali Yeremeyev || Kazakhstan Sports Palace || 3,511  || 3-1-0-0 || 9 || 
|-  style="text-align:center; background:#cfc;" 
| 5 || September 17 || Avangard Omsk || 5-2 || Vitali Yeremeyev || Kazakhstan Sports Palace || 4,063 || 4-1-0-0 || 12 || 
|-  style="text-align:center; background:#cfc;"  
| 6 || September 19 || @ Yugra Khanty-Mansiysk || 6-2 || Ari Ahonen || Arena Ugra || 2,700 || 5-1-0-0 || 15 || 
|-  style="text-align:center; background:#cfc;" 
| 7 || September 22 || Avtomobilist Yekaterinburg || 7-2|| Ari Ahonen || Kazakhstan Sports Palace || 4,100 || 6-1-0-0 || 18 || 
|-  style="text-align:center; background:#cfc;" 
| 8 || September 26 || @ Donbass Donetsk || 4-2 || Ari Ahonen || Druzhba Arena || 3,916 || 7-1-0-0 || 21 || 
|-  style="text-align:center; background:#fcc;" 
| 9 || September 28 || @ Medveščak Zagreb || 2-3 || Ari Ahonen || Dom Sportova || 6,350 || 7-2-0-0 || 21 || 
|-  style="text-align:center; background:#cfc;" 
| 10 || September 30 || @ Dinamo Minsk || 4-2 || Vitali Yeremeyev || Minsk-Arena || 7,825 || 8-2-0-0 || 24 || 
|-

|-  style="text-align:center; background:#cfc;"
| 11 || October 2 || @ Spartak Moscow || 4-3 || Ari Ahonen || Sokolniki Arena || 2,309 || 9-2-0-0 || 27 || 
|-  style="text-align:center; background:#d0e7ff;"
| 12 || October 8 || Vityaz Podolsk || 3-2 (SO) || Ari Ahonen || Kazakhstan Sports Palace || 4,050 || 9-2-1-0 || 29 || 
|-  style="text-align:center; background:#d0e7ff;"
| 13 || October 10 || Dynamo Moscow || 4-3 (SO) || Vitali Yeremeyev || Kazakhstan Sports Palace || 4,050 || 9-2-2-0 || 31 || 
|-  style="text-align:center; background:#fcc;"
| 14 || October 12 || Ak Bars Kazan || 0-5 || Ari Ahonen || Kazakhstan Sports Palace || 4,070 || 9-3-2-0 || 31 || 
|-  style="text-align:center; background:#cfc;"
| 15 || October 14 || Torpedo Nizhny Novgorod || 4-2 || Vitali Yeremeyev || Kazakhstan Sports Palace || 4,070 || 10-3-2-0 || 34 || 
|-  style="text-align:center; background:#cfc;"
| 16 || October 17 || @ Metallurg Novokuznetsk || 5-3 || Vitali Yeremeyev || Kuznetsk Metallurgists Arena || 2,715 || 11-3-2-0 || 37 || 
|-  style="text-align:center; background:#cfc;"
| 17 || October 19 || @ Sibir Novosibirsk || 3-2 || Vitali Yeremeyev || Ice Sports Palace Sibir || 7,400 ||  12-3-2-0 || 40 || 
|-  style="text-align:center; background:#cfc;"
| 18 || October 21 || @ Admiral Vladivostok || 3-1 || Ari Ahonen || Fetisov Arena || 5,500 || 13-3-2-0 || 43 || 
|-  style="text-align:center; background:#cfc;"
| 19 || October 23 || @ Amur Khabarovsk || 4-3 || Ari Ahonen || Platinum Arena || 6,820 || 14-3-2-0 || 46 || 
|-  style="text-align:center; background:#fcc;"
| 20 || October 26 || Metallurg Magnitogorsk || 1-2 || Vitali Yeremeyev || Kazakhstan Sports Palace || 4,070 || 14-4-2-0 || 46 || 
|-  style="text-align:center; background:#fcc;"
| 21 || October 28 || Traktor Chelyabinsk || 1-5 || Vitali Yeremeyev || Kazakhstan Sports Palace || 4,070 || 14-5-2-0 || 46 || 
|-  style="text-align:center; background:#cfc;"
| 22 || October 30 || Neftekhimik Nizhnekamsk || 5-1 || Ari Ahonen || Kazakhstan Sports Palace || 4,000 ||  15-5-2-0 || 49 || 
|-

|-  style="text-align:center; background:#cfc;"
| 23 || November 1 || Salavat Yulaev Ufa || 3-2 || Ari Ahonen || Kazakhstan Sports Palace || 4,070 || 16-5-2-0 || 52 || 
|-  style="text-align:center; background:#ffeeaa;"
| 24 || November 13 || @ Dinamo Riga || 2-3 (SO) || Ari Ahonen || Arena Riga || 7,120 || 16-5-2-1 || 53 || 
|-  style="text-align:center; background:#fcc;"
| 25 || November 15 || @ CSKA Moscow || 0-3 || Ari Ahonen || CSKA Ice Palace || 4,373 || 16-6-2-1 || 53 || 
|-  style="text-align:center; background:#cfc;"
| 26 || November 17 || @ Slovan Bratislava || 6-2 || Vitali Yeremeyev || Slovnaft Arena || 10,055 || 17-6-2-1 || 56 || 
|-  style="text-align:center; background:#d0e7ff;"
| 27 || November 19 || @ Lev Prague || 3-2 (OT) || Vitali Yeremeyev || Tipsport Arena || 4,716 || 17-6-3-1 || 58 || 
|-  style="text-align:center; background:#ffeeaa;"
| 28 || November 22 || Dinamo Riga || 4-5 (SO) || Ari Ahonen || Kazakhstan Sports Palace || 4,070 || 17-6-3-2 || 59 || 
|-  style="text-align:center; background:#fcc;"
| 29 || November 24 || CSKA Moscow || 2-5 || Vitali Yeremeyev || Kazakhstan Sports Palace || 4,070 || 17-7-3-2 || 59 || 
|-  style="text-align:center; background:#cfc;"
| 30 || November 26 || Slovan Bratislava || 6-1 || Ari Ahonen || Kazakhstan Sports Palace || 4,002 || 18-7-3-2 || 62 || 
|-  style="text-align:center; background:#fcc;"
| 31 || November 28 || Lev Prague || 2-3 || Ari Ahonen || Kazakhstan Sports Palace || 4,070 || 18-8-3-2 || 62 || 
|-

|-  style="text-align:center; background:#d0e7ff;"
| 32 || December 1 || @ Metallurg Magnitogorsk || 4-3 (SO) || Ari Ahonen || Arena Metallurg || 7,061 || 18-8-4-2 || 64 || 
|-  style="text-align:center; background:#cfc;"
| 33 || December 3 || @ Traktor Chelyabinsk || 4-0 || Ari Ahonen || Traktor Ice Arena || 7,450 || 19-8-4-2 || 67 || 
|-  style="text-align:center; background:#cfc;"
| 34 || December 5 || @ Neftekhimik Nizhnekamsk || 1-0 || Ari Ahonen || Neftekhimik Ice Palace || 5,000 || 20-8-4-2 || 70 || 
|-  style="text-align:center; background:#fcc;"
| 35 || December 7 || @ Salavat Yulaev Ufa || 3-6 || Ari Ahonen || Ufa Arena || 7,820 || 20-9-4-2 || 70 || 
|-  style="text-align:center; background:#cfc;"
| 36 || December 11 || Metallurg Novokuznetsk || 5-3 || Ari Ahonen || Kazakhstan Sports Palace || 4,070 || 21-9-4-2 || 73 || 
|-  style="text-align:center; background:#fcc;"
| 37 || December 13 || Sibir Novosibirsk || 3-4 || Vitali Yeremeyev || Kazakhstan Sports Palace || 4,070 || 21-10-4-2 || 73 || 
|-  style="text-align:center; background:#cfc;"
| 38 || December 26 || Admiral Vladivostok || 6-3 || Ari Ahonen || Kazakhstan Sports Palace || 4,070 || 22-10-4-2 || 76 || 
|-  style="text-align:center; background:#cfc;"
| 39 || December 28 || Amur Khabarovsk || 8-2 || Ari Ahonen || Kazakhstan Sports Palace || 4,070 || 23-10-4-2 || 79 || 
|-

|-  style="text-align:center; background:#d0e7ff;"
| 40 || January 3 || @ Vityaz Podolsk || 2-1 (SO) || Ari Ahonen || Vityaz Ice Palace || 4,300 || 23-10-5-2 || 81 || 
|-  style="text-align:center; background:#ffeeaa;"
| 41 || January 5 || @ Dynamo Moscow || 2-3 (OT) || Vitali Yeremeyev || Balashikha Arena || 5,486 || 23-10-5-3 || 82 || 
|-  style="text-align:center; background:#cfc;"
| 42 || January 7 || @ Ak Bars Kazan || 2-1 || Ari Ahonen || TatNeft Arena || 7,210 || 24-10-5-3 || 85 || 
|-  style="text-align:center; background:#fcc;"
| 43 || January 9 || @ Torpedo Nizhny Novgorod || 2-7 || Vitali Yeremeyev || Trade Union Sport Palace || 5,500 || 24-11-5-3 || 85 || 
|-  style="text-align:center; background:#cfc;"
| 44 || January 14 || Spartak Moscow || 4-2 || Ari Ahonen || Kazakhstan Sports Palace || 4,070 || 25-11-5-3 || 88 || 
|-  style="text-align:center; background:#fcc;"
| 45 || January 16 || Medveščak Zagreb || 1-3 || Ari Ahonen || Kazakhstan Sports Palace || 4,070 || 25-12-5-3 || 88 || 
|-  style="text-align:center; background:#fcc;"
| 46 || January 18 || Donbass Donetsk || 2-6 || Ari Ahonen || Kazakhstan Sports Palace || 4,070 || 25-13-5-3 || 88 || 
|-  style="text-align:center; background:#ffeeaa;"
| 47 || January 20 || Dinamo Minsk || 1-2 (OT) || Vitali Yeremeyev || Kazakhstan Sports Palace || 4,020 || 25-13-5-4 || 89 || 
|-  style="text-align:center; background:#fcc;"
| 48 || January 24 || @ Avtomobilist Yekaterinburg || 2-6 || Ari Ahonen || KRK Uralets || 5,570 || 25-14-5-4 || 89 || 
|-  style="text-align:center; background:#d0e7ff;"
| 49 || January 26 || @ Avangard Omsk || 5-4 (OT) || Vitali Yeremeyev || Arena Omsk || 10,040 || 25-14-6-4 || 91 || 
|-  style="text-align:center; background:#cfc;"
| 50 || January 28 || Yugra Khanty-Mansiysk || 4-2 || Ari Ahonen || Kazakhstan Sports Palace || 4,070 || 26-14-6-4 || 94 || 
|-

|-  style="text-align:center; background:#fcc;"
| 51 || February 26 || @ Atlant Moscow Oblast || 1-5 || Ari Ahonen || Mytishchi Arena || 4,900 || 26-15-6-4 || 94 || 
|-  style="text-align:center; background:#fcc;"
| 52 || February 28 || @ SKA Saint Petersburg || 2-3 || Vitali Yeremeyev || Ice Palace || 12,186 || 26-16-6-4 || 94 || 
|-

|-  style="text-align:center; background:#fcc;"
| 53 || March 2 || @ Severstal Cherepovets || 1-2 || Ari Ahonen || Ice Palace || 4,140 || 26-17-6-4 || 94 || 
|-  style="text-align:center; background:#fcc;"
| 54 || March 4 || @ Lokomotiv Yaroslavl || 1-4 || Ari Ahonen || Arena 2000 || 8,757 || 26-18-6-4 || 94 || 
|-

|-
| colspan=11 align="center"|

Playoffs

|-  style="text-align:center; background:#cfc;"
| 1 || March 8 || Avtomobilist Yekaterinburg || 3–2 (2OT) || Ari Ahonen || Kazakhstan Sports Palace || 4,070 || 1–0 || 
|-  style="text-align:center; background:#cfc;"
| 2 || March 9 || Avtomobilist Yekaterinburg || 5–4 (OT) || Vitali Yeremeyev || Kazakhstan Sports Palace || 4,070 || 2–0 ||  
|-  style="text-align:center; background:#cfc;"
| 3 || March 11 || Avtomobilist Yekaterinburg || 2–1 || Vitali Yeremeyev || KRK Uralets || 5,570 || 3–0 || 
|-  style="text-align:center; background:#cfc;"
| 4 || March 12 || Avtomobilist Yekaterinburg || 2–1 || Vitali Yeremeyev || KRK Uralets || 5,570 || 4–0 || 
|-

|-  style="text-align:center; background:#fcc;"
| 1 || March 21 || Salavat Yulaev Ufa || 2–3 (OT) || Vitali Yeremeyev || Kazakhstan Sports Palace || 4,070 || 0–1 || 
|-  style="text-align:center; background:#cfc;"
| 2 || March 22 || Salavat Yulaev Ufa || 5–2 || Vitali Yeremeyev || Kazakhstan Sports Palace || 4,070 || 1–1 || 
|-  style="text-align:center; background:#fcc;"
| 3 || March 24 || Salavat Yulaev Ufa || 2–5 || Vitali Yeremeyev || Ufa Arena || 7,570 || 1–2 || 
|-  style="text-align:center; background:#fcc;"
| 4 || March 25 || Salavat Yulaev Ufa || 2–3 (OT) || Vitali Yeremeyev || Ufa Arena || 7,870 || 1–3 || 
|-  style="text-align:center; background:#cfc;"
| 5 || March 27 || Salavat Yulaev Ufa || 2–1 || Vitali Yeremeyev || Kazakhstan Sports Palace || 4,070 || 2–3 || 
|-  style="text-align:center; background:#fcc;"
| 6 || March 29 || Salavat Yulaev Ufa || 2–3 || Vitali Yeremeyev || Ufa Arena || 7,820 || 2-4 ||  
|-

|-
| colspan=11 align="center"|

Player statistics
Last updated: March 7, 2014.Source: Kontinental Hockey League.

Skaters

Goaltenders

Awards

Final roster
Updated January 9, 2014.

|}

Transactions

Trades

Free agents signed

Extensions

Free agents lost

Lost via Waivers

Draft picks

Barys Astana's picks at the 2013 KHL Junior Draft in Donetsk, Ukraine at the Druzhba Arena on May 25–26, 2013.

Farm teams
Nomad Astana (Kazakhstan Hockey Championship)
Snezhnye Barsy (Junior Hockey League)

See also
2013–14 KHL season

References

Barys Astana seasons
Astana
Barys